Epidendrum vesicatum  is an epiphytic species of orchid of the genus Epidendrum, occurring in Brazil.

References

vesicatum
Orchids of Brazil